The 2010 Bodog.com World Grand Prix was the thirteenth staging of the World Grand Prix. It was played from 4–10 October 2010 at the Citywest Hotel in Dublin, Ireland.

James Wade won his second World Grand Prix title, defeating Adrian Lewis in the final. Defending champion Phil Taylor was aiming to win his tenth World Grand Prix, but was beaten by Lewis in the semi-finals.

Prize money
The total prize fund was £350,000. This was the same as the 2009 tournament.

The following is the breakdown of the fund:

Qualification
The field of 32 players was mostly made up from the top 16 in the PDC Order of Merit on September 20, following the two Players Championships in Nuland, Netherlands. The top 8 from these rankings were also the seeded players. The remaining 16 places went to the top 12 non-qualified players from the Players Championship Order of Merit, and then to the top 4 non-qualified residents of the Republic of Ireland and Northern Ireland from the 2010 Players Championship Order of Merit who have competed in at least six Players Championship events.

Television coverage and sponsorship
The whole tournament was screened by Sky Sports in high definition.

Bodog sponsored the tournament for the first time.

Draw

Statistics

References

External links
World Grand Prix page on the PDC's official website
2010 World Grand Prix on Dartsdatabase

World Grand Prix (darts)
World Grand Prix Darts
World Grand Prix Darts
World Grand Prix Darts